Dillon Lewis (born 4 January 1996) is a Welsh rugby union player who plays for the Cardiff Rugby at tighthead prop.

Lewis made his debut for the Cardiff in 2014 having been developed through their academy system. He has also played on permit for Pontypridd RFC.

International
Lewis is a Wales under-20 international. He made his full Welsh international debut 16 June 2017 against Tonga.

International tries

References

External links

Cardiff Blues Player Profile

1996 births
Living people
Cardiff Rugby players
Rugby union players from Church Village
Wales international rugby union players
Welsh rugby union players
Rugby union props